Anse-Rouge Airport  is an airstrip  northwest of Anse-Rouge, a coastal town in the department of Artibonite, Haiti. Google Earth Historical Imagery shows the airstrip was constructed sometime between June 2000 and September 2003.

See also
Transport in Haiti
List of airports in Haiti

References

External links
OpenStreetMap - Anse-Rouge
Anse-Rouge takeoff and departure YouTube video

Airports in Haiti